Manuela Laura Pesko (born 18 September 1978 in Chur) is a Swiss snowboarder.

External links
 ManuelaPesko.com
 

Swiss female snowboarders
Snowboarders at the 2006 Winter Olympics
Snowboarders at the 2010 Winter Olympics
Olympic snowboarders of Switzerland
1978 births
Living people
People from Chur
Sportspeople from Graubünden
21st-century Swiss women